Cauls Pond is a wetland in Anguilla, a British Overseas Territory in the Caribbean Sea. It is one of the territory's Important Bird Areas (IBAs).

Description
Cauls Pond is a rectangular brackish lagoon in the Sandy Hill district, near the south-east coast of the island. The second largest enclosed body of water in Anguilla, it lies beneath sea level and has a relatively large catchment. The substrate is mostly limestone with marl at its western end. It contains a small mudflat island. The vegetation around the edge of the pond consists of cacti and buttonwood mangroves, with other trees and shrubs growing behind them.

Birds
The 43 ha IBA, consisting of the pond and its immediate surroundings, was identified as such by BirdLife International because it supports a breeding colony of least terns as well as populations of brown pelicans, laughing gulls, green-throated caribs, Caribbean elaenias, pearly-eyed thrashers and Lesser Antillean bullfinches.

References

Important Bird Areas of Anguilla
Wetlands of Anguilla
Seabird colonies
Lagoons of Anguilla